"One, Two, Three" is a song by Dutch pop group Ch!pz. It's certified platinum by NVPI and reached number one on Netherlands Top 40 and 100.

Charts

Weekly charts

Year-end charts

References

2005 singles
Dutch Top 40 number-one singles
Ch!pz songs